Ras association domain-containing protein 8 is a protein that in humans is encoded by the RASSF8 gene.

References

Further reading